Count Jobst II of Hoya (1493 – 25 April 1545) ruled the County of Hoya from 1511 until his death.

Life

Family 
He was the eldest son of Count Jobst I and his wife, Ermengarde of Lippe.  After the early death of his father in 1507, a regency council was formed, consisting of the Count of Spiegelberg, the Lord of Diepholz and his mother.

His younger brother John VII entered into Swedish service and became governor of Vyborg.  His brother Eric IV inherited the Stolzenau section of the county.   His sisters Anna and Elisabeth were canonesses of Vreden Abbey and Essen Abbey.

Reign 
After a feudal dispute, the County of Hoya was occupied by Dukes Henry the Middle and  Henry the Elder of Brunswick-Lüneburg in 1512.  Jobst and his family found refuge with Count Edzard I of East Frisia.  In 1519, a compromise was found and Hoya was returned to Jobst, after he paid a huge sum of money.

Jobst introduced the Reformation in the county of Hoya.  He was a supporter of Martin Luther as early as 1523.  In 1525, Luther sent the theologian Adrian Buxschott to Hoya.  In 1532, Jobst dissolved the abbey in Bücken and other monasteries in Hoya; only the abbey in Bassum was allowed to continue as a befitting place for unmarried daughters of the nobility.

Jobst's reign saddled the county with heavy debts and mortgages on many manors.  He also left unresolved disputes with his creditors.

Death 
Jobst and his wife both died in 1545.  They were buried in the St. Martin church in Nienburg.  Her tomb is located in the hall below the church tower.

Marriage and issue 
Jobst married Anna of Gleichen and had the following children:
 Albert (1526–1563), Count of Hoya 1545–1563
 Eric V (1535–1575), Count of Hoya 1563–1575
 Otto (1530–1582), Count of Hoya 1575–1582
 Margaret, (1527–1596), abbess of Bassum Abbey 1541–1549, married Rudolph of Diepholz in 1549 Rudolf
 Jobst (1528–1546), canon of Cologne
 Wolfgang (1531–1560), canon of Verden, Cologne and Strasbourg
 Magdalene (1532–1545)
 Anna (1533–1585), Abbess in Bassum 1549–1584
 Mary (1534–1589), married on 7 May 1554 Hermann Georg of Limburg
 John (b. 1536), canon in Bücken
 Ermengarda (1537–1575), married John of Buren
 Elise (1538–1548)
 Frederick (b. 1540), Canon in Strasbourg

After Jobst's death, his sons Albert, Eric and Otto successively ruled Hoya.  They all died without a male heir.  With Otto's death, the House of Hoya died out in 1582.

References 
 Heinrich Gade: Historisch-geographisch-statistische Beschreibung der Grafschaften Hoya und Diepholz, Nienburg 1901
 Wilhelm Hodenberg (ed.): Hoyer Urkundenbuch, Hannover, 1848–1856
 Bernd Ulrich Hucker: Die Grafen von Hoya, Hoya, 1993
 Museum Nienburg: Die Grafschaften Bruchhausen, Diepholz, Hoya und Wölpe, Nienburg, 2000

Counts of Hoya
1493 births
1545 deaths
16th-century German people
Burials at St. Martin Church, Nienburg